Thrinimong Sangtam  (1937 – 14 February 2020) was an Indian academic and politician from Nagaland. He was a member of the Nagaland Legislative Assembly. He also served as a member of the Nagaland Public Service Commission.

Early life and education
Sangtam was born in 1937 at Alisopur village in Tuensang. He received Bachelor of Theology degree from Eastern Theological College, Jorhat and Bachelor of Divinity degree from Serampore College. Later, he received Master of Sacred Theology degree from Yale University.

Career
Sangtam worked as a lecturer of Eastern Theological College, Jorhat from 1966 to 1976. Later, he served as a member of the Tuensang Regional Council from 1969 to 1972. He served as a member of the Nagaland Public Service Commission from 9 May 1980 to 8 May 1986. He entered politics too. He was elected as a member of the Nagaland Legislative Assembly from Longkhim Chare in 1987 as an independent candidate.

Death
Sangtam died at his own residence in Tuensang on 14 February 2020 at the age of 83.

References

1937 births
2020 deaths
Indian religion academics
Independent politicians in India
Nagaland MLAs 1987–1988
Senate of Serampore College (University) alumni
Yale University alumni
People from Tuensang district